Mapletown is an unincorporated community and census-designated place in Monongahela Township, Greene County, Pennsylvania,  United States. As of the 2010 census, the population was 130.

Demographics

Etymology 
Mapletown is named for Robert "Bob" Mapel, who was also the founder of Bobtown, Pennsylvania.

Education
Mapletown is served by Southeastern Greene School District and is the location of Mapletown Junior/Senior High School.

References

External links

Census-designated places in Greene County, Pennsylvania
Census-designated places in Pennsylvania
Unincorporated communities in Pennsylvania